World Affairs Council may refer to:

 Los Angeles World Affairs Council
 San Diego World Affairs Council
 World Affairs Council of Dallas/Fort Worth
 World Affairs Council of Seattle
 World Affairs Council of the Desert
 World Affairs Council of Washington, DC
 World Affairs Councils of America
 World Affairs Council (Northern California), branded as World Affairs

See also
 Affairs Council (disambiguation)
 WAC (disambiguation)
 World Council (disambiguation)

World Affairs Councils